{{Taxobox
| name = Caenimonas
| domain = Bacteria
| phylum = Pseudomonadota
| classis = Betaproteobacteria
| ordo = Burkholderiales
| familia = Comamonadaceae
| genus = Caenimonas
| genus_authority = Ryu et al. 2008
| type_species = Caenimonas koreensis| subdivision_ranks = Species
| subdivision =C. koreensisC. terrae}}Caenimonas'' is a genus from the family of Comamonadaceae.

References

Further reading 
 
 
 

Comamonadaceae
Bacteria genera